George Waldegrave may refer to:

 George Turner Waldegrave (1889–1966), vicar involved with Scouting
 George Waldegrave, 4th Earl Waldegrave (1751–1789), British politician
 George Waldegrave, 5th Earl Waldegrave (1784–1794), British peer
 George Waldegrave, 7th Earl Waldegrave (1816–1846), British peer